The 2019 NLEX Road Warriors season was the fifth season of the franchise in the Philippine Basketball Association (PBA).

Draft picks

Roster

Philippine Cup

Eliminations

Standings

Game log

|-bgcolor=ffcccc
| 1
| January 18
| Rain or Shine
| L 87–96
| J. R. Quiñahan (19)
| Philip Paniamogan (8)
| J. R. Quiñahan (5)
| Cuneta Astrodome
| 0–1
|-bgcolor=ffcccc
| 2
| January 20
| NorthPort
| L 90–95
| John Paul Erram (19)
| Marion Magat (8)
| Kevin Alas (7)
| Smart Araneta Coliseum
| 0–2
|-bgcolor=ffcccc
| 3
| January 23
| TNT
| L 80–85
| Erram, Galanza (19)
| J. R. Quiñahan (9)
| Alas, Tallo (7)
| Smart Araneta Coliseum
| 0–3
|-bgcolor=ccffcc
| 4
| January 27
| Columbian
| W 107–97
| John Paul Erram (23)
| Marion Magat (13)
| Mark Tallo (8)
| Smart Araneta Coliseum
| 1–3

|-bgcolor=ccffcc
| 5
| February 2
| Meralco
| W 87–83
| J. R. Quiñahan (16)
| Erram, Magat (8)
| John Paul Erram (7)
| Ynares Center
| 2–3
|-bgcolor=ffcccc
| 6
| February 8
| Phoenix
| L 82–83
| J. R. Quiñahan (14)
| John Paul Erram (15)
| Philip Paniamogan (8)
| Mall of Asia Arena
| 2–4

|-bgcolor=ffcccc
| 7
| March 8
| San Miguel
| L 111–121
| J. R. Quiñahan (17)
| J. R. Quiñahan (10)
| Juami Tiongson (13)
| Smart Araneta Coliseum
| 2–5
|-bgcolor=ccffcc
| 8
| March 13
| Alaska
| W 91–70
| Galanza, Quiñahan (14)
| John Paul Erram (12)
| Paniamogan, Tiongson (4)
| Smart Araneta Coliseum
| 3–5
|-bgcolor=ccffcc
| 9
| March 17
| Blackwater
| W 122–101
| Philip Paniamogan (25)
| John Paul Erram (10)
| Juami Tiongson (11)
| Smart Araneta Coliseum
| 4–5
|-bgcolor=ffcccc
| 10
| March 24
| Barangay Ginebra
| L 96–105
| John Paul Erram (16)
| John Paul Erram (8)
| J. R. Quiñahan (6)
| Angeles University Foundation Sports Arena
| 4–6

|-bgcolor=ffcccc
| 11
| April 3
| Magnolia
| L 74–102
| Bong Galanza (10)
| John Paul Erram (12)
| Philip Paniamogan (4)
| Smart Araneta Coliseum
| 4–7

Playoffs

Bracket

Game log

|-bgcolor=ffcccc
| 1
| April 5
| Alaska
| L 80–88
| Kenneth Ighalo (16)
| John Paul Erram (19)
| John Paul Erram (4)
| Mall of Asia Arena
| 0–1

Commissioner's Cup

Eliminations

Standings

Game log

|-bgcolor=ffcccc
| 1
| May 22
| TNT
| L 87–102
| Curtis Washington (18)
| Curtis Washington (16)
| Larry Fonacier (5)
| Ynares Center
| 0–1
|-bgcolor=ffcccc
| 2
| May 25
| NorthPort
| L 79–83
| Kenneth Ighalo (18)
| Marion Magat (10)
| Lao, Paniamogan (3)
| Smart Araneta Coliseum
| 0–2
|-bgcolor=ffcccc
| 3
| May 29
| Alaska
| L 87–100
| Tony Mitchell (34)
| John Paul Erram (12)
| Juami Tiongson (9)
| Mall of Asia Arena
| 0–3

|-bgcolor=ffcccc
| 4
| June 1
| Columbian
| L 105–120
| Tony Mitchell (32)
| Tony Mitchell (16)
| Juami Tiongson (8)
| Mall of Asia Arena
| 0–4
|-bgcolor=ffcccc
| 5
| June 8
| Blackwater
| L 106–132
| Tony Mitchell (27)
| Tony Mitchell (11)
| J. R. Quiñahan (6)
| Ynares Center
| 0–5
|-bgcolor=ffcccc
| 6
| June 14
| Magnolia
| L 88–98
| Tony Mitchell (22)
| Tony Mitchell (13)
| Jericho Cruz (8)
| Mall of Asia Arena
| 0–6
|-bgcolor=ccffcc
| 7
| June 19
| Meralco
| W 100–91
| Tony Mitchell (32)
| Tony Mitchell (20)
| Jericho Cruz (6)
| Mall of Asia Arena
| 1–6
|-bgcolor=ffcccc
| 8
| June 23
| Barangay Ginebra
| L 85–100
| John Paul Erram (20)
| John Paul Erram (14)
| Galanza, Cruz (5)
| Batangas City Coliseum
| 1–7
|-bgcolor=ccffcc
| 9
| June 28
| Rain or Shine
| W 100–97
| Olu Ashaolu (26)
| Olu Ashaolu (13)
| Ashaolu, Cruz (6)
| Smart Araneta Coliseum
| 2–7

|-bgcolor=ffcccc
| 10
| July 5
| San Miguel
| L 105–109
| Olu Ashaolu (31)
| Olu Ashaolu (15)
| Juami Tiongson (6)
| Mall of Asia Arena
| 2–8
|-bgcolor=ccffcc
| 11
| July 12
| Phoenix
| W 87–85
| Olu Ashaolu (17)
| Olu Ashaolu (17)
| Olu Ashaolu (5)
| Cuneta Astrodome
| 3–8

Governors' Cup

Eliminations

Standings

Bracket

Transactions

Trades

Preseason

Awards

References

NLEX Road Warriors seasons
NLEX Road Warriors